Gregory Alan Grant (born August 29, 1966) is a retired American professional basketball player.

Growing up in a broken home, Grant worked in a fish market while in high school. After being discovered at the local playground, the 5'7" (1.70 m) point guard enrolled at Trenton State College (now The College of New Jersey, or TCNJ for short) in 1986, and led Division III in scoring in 1989.

That same year he was selected with the 52nd overall pick by the Phoenix Suns in the NBA Draft. He spent nine years in the NBA, playing for six different teams. Grant now runs a sports academy in Trenton. He also offers one-on-one instructions and clinics.

With the help of writer (and fellow Trenton native) Martin Sumners, Grant detailed his unlikely journey from the playgrounds to college and all the way to the NBA in his autobiography, 94 Feet and Rising: The Journey of Greg Grant to the NBA and Beyond, released on July 17, 2009.

Grant was named head coach of Trenton Central High School in 2010. He implemented initiatives that included a larger focus on education and better performances on court. In the 2013–14 school year, he coached Trenton to a 27–3 record en route to the Mercer County division title, and the school's first ever Colonial Valley Conference Championship (they lost to Linden in the state championship). He retired after five years, compiling a 100–32 record over that time, and a 100 percent graduation rate from his players.

See also
 List of shortest players in National Basketball Association history

References

External links
 94 Feet and Rising: The Journey of Greg Grant to the NBA and Beyond
 College & NBA stats on Basketball-Reference.com
 College & NBA stats on DatabaseBasketball.com
 "What Greg has Granted" by Rob Anthes on TrentonDowntowner.com

1966 births
Living people
African-American basketball players
American expatriate basketball people in Hungary
American expatriate basketball people in Italy
American expatriate basketball people in Mexico
American men's basketball players
Atlantic City Seagulls players
Basketball coaches from New Jersey
Basketball players from Trenton, New Jersey
Capitanes de Arecibo players
Charlotte Hornets players
Connecticut Pride players
Denver Nuggets players
Grand Rapids Hoops players
International Basketball League (1999–2001) coaches
Mexico Aztecas players
Morris Brown College alumni
New York Knicks players
Philadelphia 76ers players
Phoenix Suns draft picks
Phoenix Suns players
Point guards
Rapid City Thrillers players
San Diego Wildcards players
Shreveport Storm players
Sioux Falls Skyforce (CBA) players
S.L. Benfica basketball players
TCNJ Lions men's basketball players
Trenton Central High School alumni
Washington Bullets players
United States Basketball League coaches
21st-century African-American people
20th-century African-American sportspeople